Bismuth(III) sulfide is a chemical compound of bismuth and sulfur. It occurs in nature as the mineral bismuthinite.

Synthesis
Bismuth(III) sulfide can be prepared by reacting a bismuth(III) salt with hydrogen sulfide:

Bismuth (III) sulfide can also be prepared by the reaction of elemental bismuth and elemental sulfur in an evacuated silica tube at 500 °C for 96 hours.

Properties
Bismuth(III) sulfide is isostructural with stibnite (stibnite is one of the forms of antimony(III) sulfide). Bismuth atoms are in two different environments, both of which have 7 coordinate Bismuth atoms, 4 in a near planar rectangle and three more distant making an irregular 7-coordination group. 

It can react with acids to produce the odoriferous hydrogen sulfide gas.

Bismuth(III) sulfide may be produced in the body by the reaction of the common gastrointestinal drug bismuth subsalicylate with naturally occurring sulfides; this causes temporary black tongue when the sulfides are in the mouth and black feces when the sulfides are in the colon.

Uses
It is used as a starting material to produce many other bismuth compounds.

References

Bismuth sulfide
Sulfides